Franz "Ferry" Dusika (31 March 1908 – 12 February 1984) was an Austrian cyclist. He competed in two events at the 1928 Summer Olympics and two events at the 1936 Summer Olympics. The Ferry-Dusika-Hallenstadion arena in Vienna is named after him.

References

External links
 

1908 births
1984 deaths
Austrian male cyclists
Olympic cyclists of Austria
Cyclists at the 1928 Summer Olympics
Cyclists at the 1936 Summer Olympics
Cyclists from Vienna